The William Hanley Trophy is awarded annually by Ontario Hockey League to the most sportsmanlike player. It is named for Bill Hanley, a former secretary-manager of the Ontario Hockey Association who served in that capacity for twenty-five years. The William Hanley Trophy was first awarded in 1975. The winner of the William Hanley Trophy is nominated for the CHL Sportsman of the Year.

From 1961 to 1969, the Max Kaminsky Trophy was awarded to the most gentlemanly player.

Winners
List of William Hanley Trophy winners, as the most sportsmanlike player.
 Blue background denotes also named CHL Sportsman of the Year.

Sportsman of the year (1961–1969)
List of Max Kaminsky Trophy winners from 1961–1969, as the most gentlemanly player.

See also
 Frank J. Selke Memorial Trophy (QMJHL)
 Brad Hornung Trophy (WHL)
 List of Canadian Hockey League awards

References

External links
 Ontario Hockey League

Ontario Hockey League trophies and awards
Awards established in 1975